In New Zealand, Volcano Alert Bulletins (VABs) are the official source of warnings and alerts including current Volcanic Alert Level (VAL), intended to inform stakeholder agencies, authorities, and the public about emergencies so they can take action.

The Ministry of Civil Defence & Emergency Management, through The National Emergency Management Agency is responsible for providing such alerts to warn about natural hazards. A Scientific Alert Level is applied to the Volcano Status based on Indicative Phenomena. GNS Science operates the national geological hazards monitoring network (GeoNet).

Levels
The Volcanic Alert Level system has six levels ranging from 5 (major volcanic eruption) to 0 (no volcanic activity):

Elsewhere
To help prevent harm when living or working on or near a volcano, countries have adopted classifications to describe the various levels and stages of volcanic activity, the two main volcano warning systems being colour codes and/or numeric alert levels.   
 United States Alert System
Indonesia Alert System 
Russia
Alaska Alert System
Vanuatu Volcanic Alert Level
Colombia Alert System 

The three common popular classifications of volcanoes can be subjective, and some volcanoes thought to have been extinct have erupted again.

References

External links
Volcanic Alert Level Summary
 Whakaari/White Island Alert Level
Emergency management in New Zealand
Incident management